Henry Bellingham (died 1676) was an Anglo-Irish soldier, landowner and politician.

Bellingham was the younger son of Robert Bellingham, attorney in the Court of Exchequer, and Margaret Whyte. He was the younger brother of Sir Daniel Bellingham, 1st Baronet.

He served as an army officer in Ireland in the 1640s, and signed a predominantly military petition addressed to Charles I of England by Protestants in Ireland in late 1643. By 1648 his allegiance was with the Commonwealth and he is recorded as a lieutenant in the army of Michael Jones. He participated in the Cromwellian conquest of Ireland as a cornet in John Hewson's cavalry regiment. In 1653 he left military service and was granted land in County Louth under the Act for the Settlement of Ireland 1652, in lieu of pay, at what would later become Castlebellingham.

In 1654 Bellingham was High Sheriff of Kildare. During the 1650s he became a figure of significant influence in Louth. He served as a revenue commissioner in 1654 and 1657, a member of a commission investigating the organisation of parishes in 1658, a commissioner for the civil survey in the county, and a captain of a militia company from 1659 to 1662. He represented Louth in the Irish Convention of 1660 and was elected as a Member of Parliament for Louth in 1661. Bellingham was a poll tax commissioner in 1660 and 1661, a commissioner for setting of lands in 1662, and an assessor of hearth money in 1664. His ownership of lands in Louth was confirmed in the Act of Settlement 1662. In 1671 he was High Sheriff of Louth. 

Bellingham married Lucy Sibthorpe; they had one son, the politician Thomas Bellingham.

References

Year of birth unknown
1676 deaths
17th-century Anglo-Irish people
Irish soldiers
High Sheriffs of County Louth
High Sheriffs of Kildare
Irish MPs 1661–1666
Members of the Parliament of Ireland (pre-1801) for County Louth constituencies
People of the Irish Confederate Wars